Railway spine was a nineteenth-century diagnosis for the post-traumatic symptoms of passengers involved in railroad accidents.

The first full length medical study of the condition was John Eric Erichsen's classic book, On Railway and Other Injuries of the Nervous System. For this reason, railway spine is often known as Erichsen's disease.

Railway collisions were a frequent occurrence in the early 19th century.  Exacerbating the problem was the fact that railway cars were flimsy, wooden structures with no protection for the occupants.

Soon a group of people started coming forward who claimed that they had been injured in train crashes, but had no obvious evidence of injury. The railroads rejected these claims as fake.

The nature of symptoms caused by "railway spine" was hotly debated in the late 19th century, notably at the meetings of the (Austrian) Imperial Society of Physicians in Vienna, 1886. Germany's leading neurologist, Hermann Oppenheim, claimed that all railway spine symptoms were due to physical damage to the spine or brain, whereas French and British scholars, notably Jean-Martin Charcot and Herbert Page, insisted that some symptoms could be caused by hysteria (now known as conversion disorder).

Erichsen observed that those most likely to be injured in a railway crash were those sitting with their backs to the acceleration. This is the same injury mechanism found in whiplash. As with automobile accidents, railway and airplane accidents are now known to cause posttraumatic stress disorder (PTSD) and other psychosomatic symptoms in addition to physical trauma.

See also
 History of rail transport
 Whiplash

Notes

Injuries
Traumatology
Anxiety disorders
Obsolete terms for mental disorders
Railway accidents and incidents